Paul Cheesbrough is a British Media Executive and is Chief Technology Officer of Rupert Murdoch's Fox Corporation. He has responsibility for all the Technology in the company and also focussed on the separation of News Corporation into two separate businesses in 2013 and works for Robert Thomson after initially working directly for Murdoch.

On 31 October 2016, it was announced that Cheesbrough would be joining 21st Century Fox as Chief Technology Officer from 1 December 2016, remaining in New York.

Prior to joining News Corp, he was Chief Information Officer of News International, the UK subsidiary of News Corporation.

Cheesbrough started his career at IBM before moving to the BBC's commercial operation, BBC Worldwide. He then spent four years at the BBC as Digital Media Controller. He is widely credited for the driving corporation's digital education portfolio and the transition to digital.

In 2007, Cheesbrough joined the British newspaper, The Daily Telegraph as Chief Information Officer. He remained in that role for three years transforming the company's digital portfolio before joining News International in 2010.

References 

Year of birth missing (living people)
Living people
British media executives
News UK
Chief technology officers
Chief information officers